Mattia Ferrato (born 5 August 1989) is an Italian footballer who plays for Lega Pro Seconda Divisione team A.C. Carpenedolo.

Biography
Ferrato left for Melfi in co-ownership deal in summer 2008.

In June 2009 he was bought back by Parma but left for Pro Vercelli in co-ownership deal. In January 2010 Parma bought him back, but left for Carpenedolo in another co-ownership deal. With Carpenedolo, Ferrato finished as losing side of relegation playoffs.

References

External links
 

Italian footballers
Parma Calcio 1913 players
A.S. Melfi players
F.C. Pro Vercelli 1892 players
A.C. Carpenedolo players
Association football central defenders
Sportspeople from Parma
1989 births
Living people
Footballers from Emilia-Romagna